Quercus xalapensis, or xalapa oak, is a species of oak in the red oak group (Quercus section Lobatae). It is native to the mountains of eastern and southern Mexico, as well as Guatemala, Honduras, and Nicaragua in northern Central America.

Description
Quercus xalapensis is a large tree with a trunk  in diameter.

Range and habitat
Quercus xalapensis is native to the mountains of eastern and southern Mexico and northern Central America. Its range includes the Sierra Madre Oriental, the Sierra Madre de Oaxaca and eastern Sierra Madre del Sur, the Sierra de los Tuxtlas, and the Chiapas Highlands and Sierra Madre de Chiapas, as well as the Chortis Highlands of Honduras and Nicaragua.

The species grows in oak forest, Abies forest, and cloud forest between 1,070 and 2,000 meters elevation. It is found on shallow soils and sandstone-derived soils with an acid pH. It is shade-intolerant, and prefers relatively open areas of the forest. Young trees grow in forest clearings and can be planted in abandoned pastures. Associated plants include ephipytic orchids and bromeliads and the trees Carya ovata, Persea liebmannii, Quercus muehlenbergii, Quercus polymorpha, and Pinus pseudostrobus.

References

External links
Missouri Botanical Garden.org: Photo of herbarium specimen collected in Nicaragua (1999)

xalapensis
Trees of Central America
Oaks of Mexico
Flora of Guatemala
Flora of Honduras
Flora of Nicaragua
Cloud forest flora of Mexico
Flora of the Sierra Madre Oriental
Flora of the Sierra Madre de Oaxaca
Flora of the Central American pine–oak forests
Flora of the Central American montane forests
Sierra Madre de Chiapas
Flora of the Chiapas Highlands
Plants described in 1809
Taxa named by Aimé Bonpland
Taxonomy articles created by Polbot